Kendal Thompson (born May 14, 1992) is an American football wide receiver who is currently a free agent. He played quarterback at Oklahoma and Utah before transitioning to wide receiver in preparation for the National Football League (NFL). He signed with the Washington Redskins as an undrafted free agent in 2016. He is the son of Charles Thompson, a famous University of Oklahoma quarterback.

High school career

As a standout at Southmoore High School, Thompson was an Elite 11 finalist and also earned all-America honors. He competed in the Under Armour All-America Game. After graduating high school early in December 2010, he enrolled at the University of Oklahoma in January 2011.

College career

Oklahoma
Thompson was redshirted in 2011 and did not play in any games in 2012. As a redshirt sophomore in 2013, Thompson was slated to compete against redshirt junior Blake Bell and redshirt freshman Trevor Knight for the starting quarterback job. Thompson was forced to drop out of the quarterback derby after suffering a broken right foot during the first practice of fall camp. He was able to return during the 2013 season and made two appearances as a backup quarterback, including one during the Bedlam Series against #6 ranked Oklahoma State. On January 21, 2014, Thompson announced his intention to graduate from the University of Oklahoma in May and transfer to another college to play football as a graduate student.

Utah
Thompson transferred to the University of Utah and was eligible to play immediately after graduating from Oklahoma. He competed with junior Travis Wilson, who started 16 games at quarterback for Utah in the previous two seasons, for the starting quarterback job. It was expected that Wilson would win the quarterback competition and he was eventually named the starting quarterback over Thompson during fall camp. In a game against #8 ranked UCLA on October 4, 2014, Thompson relieved Wilson after the offense started the game with three consecutive three-and-outs. Thompson would lead Utah to a 30-28 upset victory over UCLA. In the next game against Oregon State, Thompson started the game, but was benched in favor of Wilson at halftime. Wilson would lead Utah to a double-overtime victory. On November 8, Thompson started the game against #4 ranked Oregon, but he left the game after suffering a torn ACL. The knee injury ended his 2014 season.

Professional career

Washington Redskins
Thompson signed with the Washington Redskins as an undrafted free agent on July 27, 2016. He was waived on September 3, 2016 and was signed to the practice squad the next day. After spending his entire rookie season on the practice squad, he signed a reserve/future contract with the Redskins on January 2, 2017.

On August 13, 2017, Thompson was waived/injured by the Redskins and placed on injured reserve. He was released on August 18, 2017.

Los Angeles Rams
On July 30, 2018, Thompson signed with the Los Angeles Rams. On August 31, 2018, Thompson was waived/injured by the Rams and placed on injured reserve. He was released on December 4, 2018.

Personal life
Thompson is a member of the Kiowa tribe, gaining membership through his mother. In 2014, he went through a naming ceremony and received the name "Little Wolf".

References

External links
Utah Utes bio

1992 births
Living people
Sportspeople from Oklahoma City
American football quarterbacks
American football wide receivers
Kiowa people
Oklahoma Sooners football players
Utah Utes football players
Washington Redskins players
Los Angeles Rams players